The following is a list of Socialist newspapers in Sweden.

Arbetet (Malmö), published between 1887 and 2000
Arbetaren - SAC:s weekly newspaper Link
Direkt Aktion - The official newspaper of the Swedish Anarcho-syndicalist Youth Federation Link
Avanti! - A newspaper published by the Swedish section of the International Marxist Tendency Link
Dissident - Published by a group of Communist thinkers, Batkogruppen Link
Flamman - Close to the Swedish political party Vänsterpartiet Link
Fronesis - Postmodern socialist magazine Link
Internationalen - Weekly newspaper published by the Swedish Socialistiska Partiet Link
Offensiv - Weekly newspaper published by the Swedish Trotskyist party Rättvisepartiet Socialisterna Link
Proletären - Weekly newspaper published by the Swedish Communist Party Link
Riff-Raff - Independent magazine Link
Röd Press - Published by Ung Vänster Link
Socialisten - Published by marxist social democrats/trotskyists Link
Yelah.net - Libertarian socialist online newspaper Link

Sweden
Lists of mass media in Sweden
Sweden politics-related lists
Newspapers
Socialism-related lists